Shoucheng Holdings Limited is the subsidiary of Beijing-based state-owned Shougang Group engaging in seven businesses: steel manufacturing, steel trading, shipping segment, electric generation, property investment and management and other corporate businesses.

History
Shougang Concord International was formerly Tung Wing Steel and Iron Company Limited (Tung Wing Steel). In 1992, Shougang Group partnered with Li Ka Shing from Cheung Kong Holdings to acquire 51% and 21% of total shares of Tung Wing Steel respectively, and then Tung Wing Steel became the subsidiary of Shougang Group. In 1993, Tung Wing Steel was renamed to Shougang Concord International, the present company name.

Shougang Concord International is one of the most historical red chip shares in Hong Kong. It joined the Hang Seng China-Affiliated Corporations Index in 1993, but it was expelled from the index in 2001. It rejoined the index in 2008.

References

External links
Shougang Concord International Holdings Limited

Companies listed on the Hong Kong Stock Exchange
Conglomerate companies of Hong Kong
Companies established in 1993
Companies owned by the provincial government of China
Steel companies of China
Conglomerate companies of China
CK Hutchison Holdings
1993 establishments in China